Valentin Ioviță (born 23 January 1984 in Galați, Romania) is a Romanian football player currently under contract with Liga II side CF Brăila.

External links

1984 births
Living people
Sportspeople from Galați
Romanian footballers
AFC Dacia Unirea Brăila players
FC Gloria Buzău players
FC Sportul Studențesc București players
ASC Oțelul Galați players
Liga I players
Association football midfielders